James H. Shanley (May 4, 1854 – November 4, 1904) was an American Major League Baseball outfielder.  Shanley played two games for the 1876 New York Mutuals, and had one hit in eight at bats.  Shanley died at the age of 50 in his hometown of Brooklyn, New York, and is interred at Calvary Cemetery in Woodside, Queens, New York.

References

External links

1854 births
1904 deaths
New York Mutuals players
Major League Baseball outfielders
Baseball players from New York (state)
Sportspeople from Brooklyn
Baseball players from New York City
Burials at Calvary Cemetery (Queens)
Alaskas players
Brooklyn Chelsea players
19th-century baseball players